4/11 may refer to:
April 11 (month-day date notation)
November 4 (day-month date notation)